This was the first edition of the event.

John McEnroe won the title, defeating Kevin Curren 6–3, 3–6, 6–2 in the final.

Seeds

  John McEnroe (champion)
  Tim Mayotte (second round)
  Kevin Curren (final)
  David Pate (semifinals)
  Paul Annacone (first round)
  Jimmy Arias (second round)
  Matt Anger (second round)
  Jonathan Canter (second round)

Draw

Finals

Top half

Bottom half

External links
 Main draw

Singles